Laura Spector (born October 30, 1987) is an American biathlete who competed from 2008 to 2012.

Her best World Cup finish was 19th in a sprint in Oberhof, Germany in 2011. At the 2010 Winter Olympics she finished 77th in the 7.5 km sprint event and 65th in the 15 km individual. Spector completed her undergraduate degree at Dartmouth College in 2011, with a B.A. in Biological Sciences and a minor in Jewish Studies. In 2015, Spector completed a Master's degree in medicine at the Stanford University School of Medicine, and she is currently pursuing a PhD in Genetics at Stanford.

External links
IBU profile

References

1987 births
American female biathletes
Biathletes at the 2010 Winter Olympics
Living people
Olympic biathletes of the United States
21st-century American women